For the Skiddaw group of hills, see Skiddaw Group

The Skiddaw Group is a group of sedimentary rock formations named after the mountain Skiddaw in the English Lake District. The rocks are almost wholly Ordovician in age (Tremadoc through Arenig to Llanvirn epochs) though the lowermost beds are possibly of Cambrian age. This rock sequence has previously been known as the Skiddaw Slates, the Skiddaw Slates Group and the Skiddavian Series. It consists largely of mudstones and siltstones with subordinate wacke-type sandstones. Their main occurrence is within the northern and central fells of the Lake District, either side of the major ENE-WSW aligned Causey Pike Fault, but inliers are found at Black Combe in the south of the Lake District and at Cross Fell in the North Pennines.

Stratigraphy 
In the Northern Fells of the Lake District, the Skiddaw Group comprises five formations of which the earliest/lowest is the Bitter Beck Formation. This is succeeded by the Watch Hill Formation, then the Hope Beck, Loweswater and Kirk Stile Formations in ascending order. The inlier at Cross Fell comprises just the Catterpallot Formation, a wacke sandstone which is the rough equivalent of the Watch Hill Formation, itself a wacke sandstone as is the Loweswater Formation.

Within the Central Fells are the Buttermere Formation and the overlying Tarn Moor Formation. These are matched by the Murton Formation (grey slates and thin sandstones) and the Kirkland Formation (mudstones with tuffs and lavas) at Cross Fell. The Buttermere Formation is interpreted as an olistostrome. The Tarn Moor and Kirkland Formations contain some volcaniclastic rocks. The inlier to the south at Black Combe contains the wackes of the Knott Hill Formation.

The group underlies the Borrowdale Volcanic Group in the southern and central Lake District and the Eycott Volcanic Group in the northern part of the district.

The Kirkland Formation has provided fossils of Dichograptus octobrachiatus and Heminectere rushtoni.

Metamorphism 
The sequence was affected by low-grade regional metamorphism and deformation associated with the Acadian Orogeny, causing the dominant fine-grained parts of the sequence to become slates. The resulting slaty cleavage is parallel to the axial plane of regional folds.

References

Further reading 
 J. P. Botting and L. A. Muir. 2011. A new Middle Ordovician (Late Dapingian) hexactinellid sponge from Cumbria, UK. Geological Journal 46:501-506

Geological groups of the United Kingdom
Geologic formations of England
Cambrian System of Europe
Ordovician System of Europe
Cambrian United Kingdom
Ordovician United Kingdom
Siltstone formations
Mudstone formations
Tuff formations
Geology of Cumbria